United States and Canada may refer to:
Anglo-America, however that term is sometimes used to include all the English-speaking countries of the Americas.
Northern America, which may also include some Atlantic island countries and territories
Canada–United States relations
Canada–United States border